The KNU/KNLA Peace Council (KPC) is an armed opposition group in Myanmar (Burma). It was founded on 31 January 2007 by Major General Saw Htay Maung, the then-commander of the 7th Brigade of the Karen National Liberation Army (KNLA). Despite its name, it is neither part of nor sponsored by its former parent organisation, the Karen National Union (KNU), nor the KNLA. The group is a signatory of the Nationwide Ceasefire Agreement, which was finalised in 2015.

References 

Paramilitary organisations based in Myanmar
Karen people
Rebel groups in Myanmar